KXTO (1550 AM) is a radio station licensed to Reno, Nevada, United States, serving the Reno, Sparks and Carson City areas. The station is owned by Christian Ministries of the Valley, Inc. broadcasting a Spanish Christian format. KXTO was owned by First Broadcasting of Nevada, Inc., and aired a Spanish Pop format as "Exitos 1550", before being sold to Christian Ministries of the Valley, Inc. in Spring of 2012.

In January, 2013 KXTO was granted a construction permit by the U.S. Federal Communications Commission to move to a new transmitter site, decrease day power to 2,400 watts and decrease night power to 70 watts. This permit expired.

References

External links

XTO
Spanish-language radio stations in the United States